Mandal is a sum (district) of Selenge Province in northern Mongolia. The Züünkharaa city is Mandal sum center. The Kherkh urban-type settlement is 5 km south from Züünkharaa city center, separated with Kharaa Gol river. The Tünkhel urban-type settlement is 44 km SE from Züünkharaa city center. The population of Mandal sum is 25,600 as of 2014.

Trans-Mongolian Railway crosses the sum's territory.

Boroo Gold Mine is 30 km southwest from Züünkharaa city. Gatsuurt Gold Mine is 30 km southeast from Züünkharaa city.

Ethnic composition

Sister cities
 Uiseong, South Korea
 Uiryeong, South Korea

References

Populated places in Mongolia
Districts of Selenge Province